Kalki Kannada TV was a Kannada-language 24/7 General Entertainment television channel, owned by White Horse Network Services Private Limited (WHN). The channel went on air officially on Karnataka Rajyotsava day, 1 November. The channel claimed to have all its programs in HD quality and that it offers completely original shows with no remakes from any other shows of any language.

Shows

Non - fiction 

 Abhishekam, (a devotional show which shows various temples of Karnataka)
 Vishwaroopa, (a devotional show with philosopher and astrologer, Savithru Sharma)
 Paddu's Kitchen, (an exclusively vegetarian cookery show on hosted by actress, Padmaja Rao)
 Music Mall, (live interactive show where viewers can call and win prizes by answering cinema related quiz)
 Surabhi, (a women's show that discusses women related issues such as their health, beauty, fitness, parental issues, child health etc)

Fiction 

 Anubhandha
 Amnoru
 Sevanthi Sevanthi
 Puttamalli
 Nee Iralu Jotheyali

References

Kannada-language television channels
Television stations in Bangalore
Year of establishment missing